Brookfield Infrastructure Partners L.P. is a publicly traded limited partnership with corporate headquarters in Toronto, Canada, that engages in the acquisition and management of infrastructure assets on a global basis.

Until a spin-off in January 2008, Brookfield Infrastructure was an operating unit of Brookfield Asset Management, which retains a 30 percent ownership and acts as the partnership's general manager. The company's  assets carried a book value of US$21.3 billion, on December 31, 2016.

Brookfield Infrastructure Partners owns and operates a global network of infrastructure companies in utilities, transportation, energy and communications infrastructure. It invests in transmission and telecommunication lines, toll roads, ports and pipelines. The company has an equity market capitalization of about US$17.7 billion with an investment-return target of 12 to 15 percent. Its annualized total returns since inception have been 18% on the NYSE and 26% on the TSX.

Sam Pollock is the chief executive officer of Brookfield Infrastructure Partners. He has held this position since 2006, and has been with Brookfield Asset Management since 1994.

Operations
After the spin-off from Brookfield Asset Management, Brookfield Infrastructure operated timber properties and electricity transmission lines. In September 2008, the company announced it would expand and diversify its global operations by buying infrastructure holdings from distressed Babcock & Brown, thus adding approximately US$8 billion of assets under management.

In 2010 the company completed a merger with Australian company Prime Infrastructure in which it held a minority interest.

In 2012, the company participated in a joint venture with Spain's Abertis Infraestructuras to purchase 60 percent of toll operator Obrascon Huarte Lain Brasil in a deal valued at US$1.7 billion.

Also in 2012, the company and its partners agreed to acquire the remaining 45% of the AVN toll road in Chile for a total purchase price of $590-million, after making an initial investment in 2011.

In 2014, the company and its investment partners agreed to acquire 50% of the French telecommunications units of TDF for $2.2 billion.

In 2016, the company announced agreements with Qube Holdings and other investment partners to buy the port assets of Asciano Limited, an Australian rail and port operator, for US $6.55 billion, (A$8.9 billion). The container port assets remained under the Patrick brand in a joint venture with Qube, while the bulk and automotive port services assets rebranded to Linx Cargo Care Group under a Brookfield-led consortium of investment partners. That same year, the company also announced that it and its investment partners would acquire a 90% stake in a Brazilian natural gas pipeline from Petroleo Brasileiro SA for US $5.2 billion.

The company made over $2 billion of new investments in 2016, including its first ventures into businesses in Peru and India. The company also invested in organic projects valued at $850 million, growing the size of its utilities rate base, road and rail networks and energy systems.

In 2022, the company announced an initiative with Intel to jointly invest up to $30 billion at a chip manufacturing plant in Chandler, Arizona.

The following chart lists select completed and announced acquisitions by BIP.

References

Brookfield Asset Management
Companies listed on the New York Stock Exchange
Companies listed on the Toronto Stock Exchange
Companies of Bermuda
Financial services companies established in 2008